Dap Naudé Dam is dam on the Broederstroom River, near Polokwane, Limpopo, South Africa. It was established in 1958. It was named after David Joseph Naudé (Dap Naudé), an attorney who was born in Middelburg, South Africa in 1895.

The Dam has a surface area of 28 ha and when full provides the Dap Naude Dam Reservoir with 1.9 million cubic meters of water.

See also
List of reservoirs and dams in South Africa
List of rivers of South Africa

References 
 List of South African Dams from the Department of Water Affairs and Forestry (South Africa)

Dams in South Africa
Dams completed in 1958